Wolfe's Neck Site is an archaeological site located near Lewes, Sussex County, Delaware.  The early occupation of the site was apparently a small seasonal camp. The later occupation may have been a more permanent village.  Excavations conducted by the Section of Archaeology, Division of Historic & Cultural Affairs, in 1975 at one of the hillside middens produced a dated sequence of ceramics from 500 B.C. to 330 A.D.

It was added to the National Register of Historic Places in 1978.

References

Archaeological sites on the National Register of Historic Places in Delaware
Geography of Sussex County, Delaware
Lewes, Delaware
National Register of Historic Places in Sussex County, Delaware